The Decalogue of a Ukrainian Nationalist, also known as The Ten Commandments of the Ukrainian Nationalists, was a brochure put together by Stepan Łenkawski in 1929, the creation of which was largely influenced by the contemporary doctrines of Ukrainian nationalism. The motto of the Decalogue was authored by Dmytro Dontsov.

Original version of the Decalogue  
I – the spirit of eternal element, who shielded you from the Tatar flood and placed you between two worlds, to create a new life:
 You will attain a Ukrainian state or perish fighting for it.
 You will not allow anyone to tarnish your people’s reputation or honour.
 Remember the great days of our struggle for liberation.
 Be proud that you are heir to the fight for the glory of Volodymyr's Trident.
 Avenge the death of the Great Knights.
 Do not discuss this with whomever you can, but only with whom you must.
 You will not hesitate to commit even the greatest crime, if the good of the cause demands it.
 With hatred and deceit you will receive the enemies of your nation.
 Neither pleading nor threats, torture or death will force you to reveal secrets.
 You will strive to expand the strength, fame, wealth and area of the Ukrainian state, even through the enslavement of foreigners.

Revised version of the Decalogue, created in the 1930s after the softening of some points 
I – the spirit of eternal element, who shielded you from the Tatar flood and placed you between two worlds, command a new life:
 You will attain a Ukrainian state or perish fighting for it.
 You will not allow anyone to tarnish your people’s reputation or honour.
 Remember the great days of our struggle for liberation.
 Be proud that you are heir to the fight for the glory of Volodymyr's Trident.
 Avenge the death of the Great Knights.
 Do not discuss this with whomever you can, but only with whom you must.
 You will not hesitate to complete the most dangerous of acts, if the good of the cause demands it.
 With hatred and ruthless combat you will receive the enemies of your nation.
 Neither pleading nor threats, torture or death will force you to reveal secrets.
 You will strive to expand the strength, fame, wealth and area of the Ukrainian state.

Adoption by the Organization of Ukrainian Nationalists 

The Organization of Ukrainian Nationalists (the OUN) adopted the Decalogue in 1929, and all members of the Organization were expected to adhere to it. Interpretations of the Decalogue were included in numerous ideological training documents of the Organization of Ukrainian Nationalists—Bandera faction (the OUN-B) from 1940-1945, which appeared under the title of Decalogue Explanations. These documents explained in detail the values that Ukrainian nationalists should follow on a day-to-day basis. During meetings of OUN organizational cells in Volhynia and Eastern Galicia during World War II, nationalists were subjected to ideological training based on interpretations of the Decalogue which continued to affirm the use of "cruelty" and "revenge" in the fight against the "enemy of the nation" according to the principle: "We must level the scales of justice, even larger mountains of the corpses of opponents must fall for the mountain of our dead (...) We live on the border of steppe and settled nations, in battle we will adopt the tactics of the steppe people. Cruelty to the enemy is never too great. This is what history has taught us.”

See also 
 Hutu Ten Commandments
 Massacres of Poles in Volhynia and Eastern Galicia

References 

Ukrainian nationalism
1929 documents
1929 in Ukraine